This is a list of Michelin starred restaurants in Taipei since 2018. The 2018 edition was the inaugural edition of the Michelin Guide to Taipei to be published. Taipei was the eighth Asian city/region to have a dedicated Red Guide, after Tokyo, Hong Kong & Macau, Osaka & Kyoto, Singapore, Shanghai, Seoul, and Bangkok. Michelin began reviewing restaurants in Taichung in 2020. The 2020 Michelin awarded stars to 30 restaurants in Taiwan, four in Taichung and 26 in Taipei. With three stars, the Cantonese restaurant Le Palais is the country's highest rated restaurant.

List

See also 
 Taiwanese cuisine
 List of Michelin 3-star restaurants

References

External links 
 Michelin Guide Taipei - the official website

Buildings and structures in Taipei
Michelin Guide starred restaurants
Michelin Guide
Michelin starred restaurants in Taipei